Città di Montesilvano Calcio a 5 is a futsal club based in Montesilvano, Italy. It is the only Italian club to win the UEFA Futsal Cup (2010–11)

Chronology

Honours
1  UEFA Futsal Cup (2010–11)
1  Coppa Italia
1  Serie A (2009–2010)

UEFA Club Competitions record

UEFA Futsal Cup

External links
 Official site

Futsal clubs in Italy
Sport in Abruzzo
1984 establishments in Italy
Futsal clubs established in 1984